KOLW (97.5 FM) is a radio station broadcasting a classic hits format branded as "97.5 Kool FM". Licensed to Basin City, Washington, United States, the station serves the Tri-Cities area. The station is currently owned by The Tri Cities Divestiture Trust.

History
The station was started by P-N-P Broadcasting, Inc. and was issued a construction permit as a Class A station on 97.7 MHz assigned to Othello in June, 1988. The call sign was later changed to KZLO and then to KZLN-FM. The permit was later modified to Class C3 on 97.5 MHz and signed on the air in February 1992. The station was affiliated with the ABC Pure Gold Network, and identified as "Sizzlin' Hot Oldies 97.5", serving the Columbia Basin. The station was sold to Verl Wheeler of KEYG in Grand Coulee in 1996. The station was later sold again, and the city of license was changed to Basin City and upgraded to a Class C1 station. The call letters were changed again on January 14, 2004, to KHTO. On October 31, 2004, KHTO changed call letters to the current KOLW.

On April 8, 2012, KOLW changed its branding from "Cool 97.5" to "97.5 Kool FM", tweaking its classic hits playlist from the 1960s and the 1970s into the 1970s through the 1980s.

On September 19, 2013, at 3:00 p.m., KOLW flipped to Rhythmic CHR as "Hot 97.5". The first song as "Hot" was J. Cole's "Crooked Smile".

On March 1, 2019, KOLW began stunting with construction sounds and riddles in between songs, teasing a relaunch on the following Monday, March 4, at 6 a.m., with the debut of a new morning show. One of the riddles, “Of no use for one, yet absolute bliss to two,” was related to 975KissFM.com, a domain discovered by radio industry website RadioInsight in January. The domain previously led to KOLW's former website. At the announced time, the stunting ended and KOLW relaunched as "97.5 Kiss FM", with the syndicated Brooke & Jubal in the Morning as its new morning show.

On June 17, 2022 Townsquare Media placed KOLW into The Tri Cities Divestiture Trust, as part of its acquisition of Cherry Creek Broadcasting.

On July 1, 2022, KOLW flipped back to classic hits as "97.5 Kool FM", while the Rhythmic CHR format and "Kiss FM" branding were moved to newly acquired 105.3 KONA-FM.

Previous Logos

References

External links

OLW
Classic hits radio stations in the United States
Radio stations established in 1988